Hepton was a rural district in the West Riding of Yorkshire, England, from 1894 to 1974.

The district included four civil parishes:
Heptonstall, 
Blackshaw
Erringden
Wadsworth

It was created in 1894 as the Todmorden rural district.  It was renamed in the 1930s and survived until 1974, when, under the Local Government Act 1972 it was abolished and became part of the Calderdale metropolitan borough in West Yorkshire.

References
Hepton RD through time | Census tables with data for the Local Government District

Districts of England created by the Local Government Act 1894
Districts of England abolished by the Local Government Act 1972
Local government in Calderdale
Rural districts of the West Riding of Yorkshire